Coachella (commonly  ) is a city in Riverside County, California. It is the namesake and easternmost city of the Coachella Valley, in Southern California's Colorado Desert. 

Coachella is one of California's fastest-growing cities; when it incorporated in 1946, it had 1,000 residents. By the 2020 Census, the population had grown to 41,941. The city is officially bilingual in English and Spanish, with 90% of residents speaking Spanish.

History

The city was founded as Woodspur in 1876, when the Southern Pacific Railroad built a rail siding on the site. In the 1880s the indigenous Cahuilla tribe sold their land plots to the railroads for new lands east of the current town site, and in the 1890s, a few hundred traqueros took up settlement along the tracks. In 1901, the citizens of Woodspur voted on a new name for their community and at a town hall meeting, the homeowners settled on "Coachella".

The origin of the name Coachella is unclear. Some locals believe it was a misspelling of conchilla, a Spanish word for the small white snail shells found in the valley's sandy soil, vestiges of a lake that dried up over 3,000 years ago.

Coachella began as a  territory gridded out on the mesquite-covered desert floor. Coachella became a city in 1946. During the incorporation voting process, the first city council was tentatively elected: Lester C. Cox, T. E. Reyes, John W. Westerfield, Lester True, and Paul S. Atkinson.  Also elected on November 26, 1946, were City Clerk Marie L. Johnson and City Treasurer John C. Skene. John Westerfield was appointed mayor at the first meeting.

By the 1980 census, Coachella's population had reached at least 10,000 due to relatively slow population growth. Due to a high percentage of Hispanics in the city, Coachella was a scene of Chicano political activism.  The agricultural area surrounding Coachella was where the United Farm Workers union staged strikes and protests, including visits by UFW leader César Chávez in the 1960s and 1970s. In 2018, Harrison Street (the main street in town) was renamed for him.

In 1995, state and federal officials designated Coachella as part of the Coachella Valley Enterprise Zone to boost economic activity and entice businesses to relocate to this rural city which was once home to several fruit shipping plants.

In 2006, 29-year-old Eduardo Garcia became the city's youngest mayor ever. Garcia was a lifelong Coachella resident and a 1995 graduate of Coachella Valley High School. He attended the College of the Desert in Palm Desert, California.

In 2010, a Coca-Cola bottling facility (a LEED certified building) was added to the city's new light industry facilities, a boon in the rapid-growth community which has a currently troubled economy.

Geography

Climate
This climate is dominated in all months by the subtropical anticyclone, or subtropical high, with its descending air, elevated inversions, and clear skies. Although only a short distance from Banning, California which has a warm-summer Mediterranean climate, it also lies in a rainshadow that allows Coachella only about one-fourth the precipitation of Banning. The Köppen Climate Classification subtype for this climate is "Bwh". (Tropical and Subtropical Desert Climate).

Demographics

Downtown Coachella is under renovation as the area experiences an economic boom which has brought increasing numbers of people in the city – Pueblo Viejo (the old neighborhood) as locals of Hispanic origin sometimes call it. Despite its image for Mexican immigration, a large percentage are US citizens, born and raised in Coachella. A multi-generational Mexican American subculture has taken root in the town.

Much of the population consists of younger Latino families (an estimated 90 percent of Hispanic origin) and, in the outlying areas, migrant farm workers. The city is officially bilingual in the English and Spanish languages, although city council meetings are nominally in English. Historically, Coachella was predominantly Mexican/Latino (including Central America) and/or Native American, but had other ethnic groups like Arabs, Armenians, Filipinos, Italians, Japanese and recent immigrants from Southeast Asia and the former Yugoslavia.

2010
The 2010 United States Census reported that Coachella had a population of 40,704. The population density was 1,406.0 people per square mile (542.9 per km2). The racial makeup of Coachella was 19,576 (48.1%) White (2.3% Non-Hispanic White), 320 (0.8%) African American, 290 (0.7%) Native American, 266 (0.7%) Asian, 34 (0.1%) Pacific Islander, 19,154 (47.1%) from other races, and 1,064 (2.6%) from two or more races. Hispanic or Latino of any race were 39,254 persons (96.4%).

The Census reported that 40,646 people (99.9% of the population) lived in households, 58 (0.1%) lived in non-institutionalized group quarters, and 0 (0%) were institutionalized.

There were 8,998 households, out of which 6,625 (73.6%) had children under the age of 18 living in them, 5,583 (62.0%) were opposite-sex married couples living together, 1,927 (21.4%) had a female householder with no husband present, 820 (9.1%) had a male householder with no wife present. There were 795 (8.8%) unmarried opposite-sex partnerships, and 76 (0.8%) same-sex married couples or partnerships. 464 households (5.2%) were made up of individuals, and 151 (1.7%) had someone living alone who was 65 years of age or older. The average household size was 4.52. There were 8,330 families (92.6% of all households); the average family size was 4.57.

The population was spread out, with 15,786 people (38.8%) under the age of 18, 4,889 people (12.0%) aged 18 to 24, 11,896 people (29.2%) aged 25 to 44, 6,306 people (15.5%) aged 45 to 64, and 1,827 people (4.5%) who were 65 years of age or older. The median age was 24.5 years. For every 100 females, there were 99.3 males. For every 100 females age 18 and over, there were 97.3 males.

There were 9,903 housing units at an average density of 342.1 per square mile (132.1 per km2), of which 5,586 (62.1%) were owner-occupied, and 3,412 (37.9%) were occupied by renters. The homeowner vacancy rate was 6.4%; the rental vacancy rate was 5.4%. 25,519 people (62.7% of the population) lived in owner-occupied housing units and 15,127 people (37.2%) lived in rental housing units.

According to the 2010 United States Census, Coachella had a median household income of $41,611, with 27.9% of the population living below the federal poverty line.

2000
As of the census of 2000, there were 22,724 people, 4,807 households, and 4,480 families residing in the city.  The population density was 1,091.4 people per square mile (421.4 per km2).  There were 5,024 housing units at an average density of 241.3 per square mile (93.2 per km2).  The racial makeup of the city was 38.8% White, 0.5% Black or African American, 0.8% Native American, 0.3% Asian, < 0.1% Pacific Islander, 56.6% from other races, and 3.0% from two or more races. 97.4% of the population were Hispanic or Latino of any race.

There were 4,807 households, of which 65.9% had children under the age of 18, 66.5% were married couples living together, 19.4% had a female householder with no husband present, and 6.8% were non-families. 5.3% of all households were individuals living alone, and 2.3% had someone living alone who was 65 years of age or older. The average household size was 4.72 and the average family size was 4.80.

In the city, the population was spread out, with 40.8% under the age of 18, 12.7% from 18 to 24, 28.8% from 25 to 44, 12.8% from 45 to 64, and 5.0% 65 years or older. The median age was 23 years. For every 100 females, there were 100.1 males. For every 100 females age 18 and over, there were 99.4 males.

The median income for a household in the city was $28,590, and the median income for a family was $28,320. Males had a median income of $23,044, compared to $15,550 for females. The per capita income for the city was $7,416. About 29.1% of families and 28.9% of the population were below the poverty line, including 35.3% of those under age 18 and 25.7% of those 65 or over.

Economy

Top employers
According to the city's 2020 Comprehensive Annual Financial Report, the largest employers are:

Near the city limits of Coachella are three casinos on Indian reservations: Fantasy Springs Resort and Casino, Spotlight 29 Casino, and Augustine Casino, which are owned and operated by Native American tribes – the Cabazon Band of Mission Indians, Twentynine Palms Band of Mission Indians, and Augustine Band of Cahuilla Indians, respectively. These small but highly profitable tribes have representative councils to ensure self-reliance as a community. Coachella is also home to a significant Southwest Indian (Apache, Hopi, Navajo and Zuni) population, though not indigenous to the California desert region.

Housing and Recreation 

Since 2000, thousands of single-family homes and multi-unit apartment complexes have been built at a fast pace, as the city's population soared, having more than doubled in just a decade.

In 2015, the number of unpermitted trailer parks, often housing farmworkers, was estimated at "dozens if not more than 100." Many of these parks are in poor condition. Some have dirt roads and frequent power outages, or drinking water supplies contaminated with arsenic or hexavalent chromium. It is uncertain whether it would be more practical to bring in city water and sewer lines, or to simply start over with new developments. Given that a recent 181-unit development, Mountain View Estates, required over 28 million dollars in funding, the nonprofit Pueblo Unido Community Development Corp. is pushing for code upgrades of existing facilities. A court case which alleged that the county had made an intentional effort to close trailer parks with Latino populations was settled in 2000. The US$21 million from the settlement was used to build three farmworker housing projects. As of 2015, dirt roads in 35 trailer parks are being paved as part of a US$3.4 million county project.

The city has a recreation center, a Boys and Girls Club center, and a boxing club in Bagdouma Park. There are two dance clubs and the Corona Yacht Club located near Spotlight 29 casino; two new golf courses (Desert Lakes and the Vineyards) attract many retirees, RV owners, and local business people.

Events and points of interest
Three popular fiestas are celebrated each year in town: Cinco de Mayo (May 5), the 16 de Septiembre Fiestas Patrias (Mexico's Independence from Spain) and the 12 de Diciembre (the patron saint of Mexico, Santa Maria de Guadalupe) to celebrate the Virgin Mary.

 Coachella Valley Music and Arts Festival
 Coachella Valley Radio Control Club
 Shady Lane Mural 
 The film director Frank Capra is interred in the Coachella Valley Cemetery.

Government and politics
The majority of registered voters are in the Democratic Party, a stronghold of Democrats in a largely Republican voting bloc (the Inland Empire).

Education
Coachella is served by the Coachella Valley Unified School District, based in Thermal, California. Its main high school is Coachella Valley High School (with 2900 students) followed by a new high school, Desert Mirage High School, about 5 miles to the south; its three middle schools are Cahuilla Desert Academy, Toro Canyon, and Bobby Duke. Elementary schools include Cesar Chavez, Coral Mountain Academy, Palm View, Peter Pendleton, Valle Del Sol, Valley View, Westside and in nearby Thermal, John Kelley.

The Coachella Valley Adult School, in operation since 1952, is the third-largest adult school in Riverside County. It offers seven levels of English as a Second Language (ESL), and has offered citizenship classes for over 20 years. In the last ten years, over 1,500 people completed citizenship classes at the school and submitted N-400 forms.

Public safety
The Riverside County Sheriff's Department now serves the city from the nearby Thermal Regional Station. (The original Coachella Police Department was disbanded in 1998).

The city of Coachella contracts for fire and paramedic services with the Riverside County Fire Department through a cooperative agreement with CAL FIRE.

Transportation
Near Coachella, a new four-lane expressway, State Route 86, was built for international trucking from Mexicali, Mexico to Los Angeles or Arizona. Referred to as the "NAFTA highway" (in reference to the North American Free Trade Agreement took effect in 1994), it replaces an older and less safe two-lane road known as the "killer highway, deadly highway, and death highway" where over 400 auto accident fatalities took place since 1980.

A plan is being developed for new passenger rail service that would span approximately 144 miles from Los Angeles Union Station (LAUS) to Coachella. Construction would take an estimated ten years following completion of an Environmental Impact Statement/Environmental Impact Report (EIS/EIR).

In popular culture

In 2001 Huell Howser Productions, in association with KCET/Los Angeles, featured Coachella in California's Gold; the program is available as a VHS videorecording.

Notes

References

External links

 
 Coachella Chamber Of Commerce Official site
 Hispanic Chamber of Commerce –  Coachella Valley
 

 
Coachella Valley
Cities in Riverside County, California
Incorporated cities and towns in California
Populated places established in 1876
Populated places in the Colorado Desert
1876 establishments in California